Karina Lombard (born 21 January 1969)is a Tahitian-born American actress. She appeared as Isabel Two in Legends of the Fall, as chief Nonhelema in Timeless, and as Marina Ferrer in the first and third seasons of The L Word.

She has also appeared in the films Wide Sargasso Sea and The Firm, and the television series CSI: Crime Scene Investigation, CSI: NY, NCIS, Rescue Me and The 4400.

Career
Lombard's major break in modeling was a photoshoot with a 'Native American' theme. A year later, one of her photographs was chosen for a billboard that led to her first acting role. Photographs of her as a model have appeared in the magazines Elle and Vogue.

Lombard studied acting in New York City at the Lee Strasberg Theatre Institute and the Actors Studio, where she also gained stage experience performing at the Gallery Theatre and Neighborhood Playhouse.

Lombard's first film role was as a princess in L'île (The Island). In 1993, she played her first major role as Antoinette Cosway, a Jamaican heiress, in Wide Sargasso Sea, based on the novel of the same name by Jean Rhys. She had supporting parts in The Firm (1993) and Legends of the Fall (1994), and starred in Last Man Standing (1996) with Bruce Willis.

In the 2000s, she moved to television, appearing in The 4400 and as restaurateur Marina Ferrer in the first season of The L Word. She also played the recurring character Geneviève on FX's Rescue Me.

Filmography

Television

Awards

References

External links 

 
 

Living people
People from Tahiti
American female models
American film actresses
American people of French descent
American people of French Polynesian descent
American stage actresses
American television actresses
French Polynesian actresses
French Polynesian emigrants to the United States
French Polynesian people
20th-century American actresses
21st-century American actresses
20th-century French women
Year of birth missing (living people)